Eubule Thelwall may refer to:

Eubule Thelwall (politician) (1557–1630), politician and Principal of Jesus College, Oxford 1621–30
Eubule Thelwall (landowner) (1622–1695), landowner and solicitor who held legal offices in North Wales and Cheshire
Eubule Thelwall (college principal) (1682–?), Principal of Jesus College, Oxford 1725–27

See also
Thelwall (disambiguation)